Mac Crenshaw Memorial Airport  is a city-owned public-use airport located  northeast of the central business district of Greenville, a city in Butler County, Alabama, United States.

Although most U.S. airports use the same three-letter location identifier for the FAA and IATA, this airport is assigned PRN by the FAA but has no designation from the IATA.

Facilities and aircraft 
It has one asphalt paved runway designated 14/32 which measures . For the 12-month period ending September 13, 2006, the airport had 4,274 aircraft operations, an average of 11 per day: 88% general aviation and 12% military.

References

External links 

Airports in Alabama
Transportation buildings and structures in Butler County, Alabama